The 2002 Men's Ice Hockey World Championships were held between 26 April and 11 May 2002 in Gothenburg, Karlstad and Jönköping, Sweden.

It was the 66th annual event, and was run by the International Ice Hockey Federation (IIHF). The competition also served as qualification for division placements in the 2003 competition.

Championship 

The Championship division was contested from 26 April to 11 May 2002. Participants in this tournament were placed into groups of four with the top three teams in each group advancing to the qualifying round. Teams which finished last in the group were sent to the relegation round where the top bottom teams were relegated to the 2003 Division I tournament. Within the qualifying round teams where split into two groups of six with the top four advancing to the playoff round and the bottom two eliminated from advancing. The playoff round was a knockout stage towards the gold medal game. The Championship was played in Gothenburg, Sweden. Slovakia won the gold medal game, defeating Russia 4–3. While Poland and Italy were relegated to Division I for 2003.

Final standings
 
 
 
 
 
 
 
 
 
 
 
 
 
  — relegated to Division I for 2003
  — relegated to Division I for 2003
  — Far Eastern qualifier for 2003

Division I

Group A 

Group A was played in Eindhoven, The Netherlands between April 14 and April 20, 2002.

Group B 

Group B was played in Székesfehérvár and Dunaújváros, Hungary between April 14 and April 20, 2002.

Division II 
To integrate a new Division III being added for the 2003 Championships, the bottom team in each pool was relegated to the 2003 inaugural Division III competition.

Group A 

Group A was played in Cape Town, South Africa between March 31 and April 6, 2002.

Group B 

Group B was played in Novi Sad, Yugoslavia between March 25 and March 31, 2002.

Division II Qualification 

In anticipation of a Division III being added for the 2003 Championships, a pseudo-Division III tournament was held in 2002, to determine two teams that would earn qualification (not "promotion") to Division II in 2003. This Division II Qualification tournament took place between April 11 and April 13, 2002 in Mexico City, Mexico.

All times local

References

External links 
 IIHF Website
 Complete results at Passionhockey.com
 

IIHF Men's World Ice Hockey Championships
World Ice Hockey Championships – Men's